Kambanda is a surname. Notable people with the surname include:

Antoine Kambanda (born 1958), Rwandan Roman Catholic archbishop
Jean Kambanda (born 1955), Rwandan politician

Surnames of African origin